The Andhra Pradesh Police is the law enforcement agency of the state of Andhra Pradesh, India. Public order and police being a state subject in India, the police force is headed by the Director general of police, Kasireddy Rajendranadh Reddy

History
The Madras Act XXIV of 1859 which marked the beginning of the Madras Police and shortly later, the Police Act of 1861 instituted the system of police which forms the foundation of modern-day police in India. The "Ceded Areas" of Andhra, as they were popularly known, continued as a part of the Madras Police and it was only in October 1953, after the birth of a separate Andhra State, that the Andhra State Police gained individual existence. Finally with the formation of the Andhra Pradesh on 1 November 1956 integrating the Telugu areas of the erstwhile Hyderabad state with the Andhra State, the modern day Andhra Pradesh Police came into existence. After the bifurcation of the state in 2014, the police force once again bifurcated. This time, it was divided into Andhra Pradesh police and Telangana Police.

Andhra Pradesh State Level Recruitment Board

The Andhra Pradesh State Police Recruitment Board is responsible for recruitment. The board is releases recruitment notification time to time and conducts written examinations, physical tests, medical tests, and interviews for selecting applicants.

Police ranks
The Andhra Pradesh Police designates the following ranks

Officers
Director General of Police
Additional Director General of Police
Inspector General of Police
Deputy Inspector General of Police
Senior Superintendent of Police
Superintendent of Police
Additional Superintendent of Police
Assistant superintendent of police ASP
Assistant superintendent of police rank 2 ASP
Assistant superintendent of police rank 1 ASP

Sub-ordinates
Inspector of Police
Assistant Inspector of Police 
Sub-inspector (SI)
Assistant sub-inspector of police (ASI)
Head constable
Senior Police Constable 
Police Constable

Structure and organization

Districts
Each police district is either coterminous with the Revenue district, or is located entirely within a revenue district. It is headed by a District commissioner of Police (or simply called Superintendent of Police). Each district comprises two or more Sub-Divisions, several circles and Police Stations.

Sub-Divisions
Each Sub-Division is headed by a Police officer of the rank Deputy Superintendent of Police (Officers of Andhra Pradesh Police Service are directly recruited officers or promoted from lower ranks) or an Additional Superintendent of Police (Officers of Indian Police Service). The officer who heads a Sub-Division is known as S.D.P.O. resp. Sub Divisional Police Officer.

Circles
A Circle comprises several Police Stations. An Inspector of Police who heads a police circle is the Circle Inspector of Police or CI.

Stations
A Police Station is headed by an Inspector (an upper subordinate rank). A Police Station is the basic unit of policing, responsible for prevention and detection of crime, maintenance of public order, enforcing law in general as well as for performing protection duties and making security arrangements for the constitutional authorities, government functionaries, representatives of the public in different legislative bodies and local self governments, public figures etc.

Commissionerate
A Police Commissionerate is a law enforcement body especially in the urban parts of the state. The commissionerate is headed by a Commissioner of Police. Vijayawada City Police and Visakhapatnam City Police are the local law enforcement agencies for the cities of Vijayawada and Visakhapatnam respectively. The Guntur Urban Police is being planned to be upgraded as Guntur Police Commissionerate.

Insignia of Andhra Pradesh Police (State Police)
Gazetted Officers

Non-gazetted officers

List of Directors General of Police in Andhra Pradesh

Incidents

On 12 May 2017, Andhra Pradesh Police computer's network was attacked by a malware known as WannaCry ransomware attack which was found to be critical.

See also
Operation Puttur
Visakhapatnam City Police
Vijayawada City Police

Notes

References

External links
 Police mains exam answer key.

 
State law enforcement agencies of India
1956 establishments in Andhra Pradesh